Mogeri Gopalakrishna Adiga (18.2.1918–14.11.1992) was a modern Kannada poet. He is known by some commentators as the "pioneer of New style" poetry.

Biography
He was born in an orthodox brahmin family in coastal village of Mogeri, Udupi district, in Karnataka State. After primary education in Mogeri and Baindooru, he went to high school in Kundapur, As editor of Saakshi magazine he helped bring Kannada literature to the masses.

Adiga's grandson is Manu Raju, Senior Political reporter for CNN.

Work
In the 1950s and 1960s Adiga was a teacher in Mysore. From 1964 until 1968 he was the principal of Lal Bahadur College in Sagara, and from 1968 until 1971 he was Principal of Poorna Prajna College in Udupi.

His style has been described  as a response to the independence of India from British rule in 1947. The style called Navya was generally about the new times. Inspired by modern Western literature and Indian tradition, he set out to portray the "disillusionment and angst of the times".

Works
Bhavataranga - 1946
Anathey' - 1954 (novel)Bhoomi Geetha - 1959Mannina Vasane (book of essays) - 1966Vardhamana - 1972Idanna Bayasiralilla (poems) - 1975Samagra Kavya (collection of poems) - 1976 Sakshi'' (Magazine) - 1962

Quotes

"ಇರುವುದೆಲ್ಲವ ಬಿಟ್ಟು ಇರದುದರೆಡೆಗೆ ತುಡಿವುದೆ ಜೀವನ?" (Iruvudellava bittu iradudaredege tudivude jeevana?)

Is life leaving everything we have and craving for things which we do not have?

"ಮೌನ ತಬ್ಬಿತು ನೆಲವ" (mouna tabbitu nelava)

See also
 Kannada language
 Kannada literature
 Kannada poetry
 Gopalakrishna Bharathi

References

Kannada poets
Hindu poets
1918 births
1992 deaths
People from Udupi district
Mangaloreans
Recipients of the Sahitya Akademi Award in Kannada
Academic staff of the University of Mysore
Maharaja's College, Mysore alumni
20th-century Indian poets
Poets from Karnataka
Indian male poets
Bharatiya Jana Sangh politicians
20th-century Indian male writers